Cracked  is a British comedy-drama television series which was broadcast on STV in 2008. Created and written by Clare Hemphill and Kate Donnelly, the drama series was set in a Scottish countryside residential rehab clinic, a place where people with various mental and emotional problems check themselves in for some professional tender loving care. Over six episodes, the series deals with issues that are difficult and dark, but also more light-hearted and comical situations.

Cracked was produced by STV Studios in 2005, but due to the lack of appropriate regional time-slots, the series was not broadcast until 2008, where it was shown on Thursday nights at 10:40pm, taking the place of popular comedy drama High Times.

External links

 (STV Player)

2000s British comedy-drama television series
2000s Scottish television series
2008 in Scotland
2008 Scottish television series debuts
2008 Scottish television series endings
British comedy-drama television shows
English-language television shows
Scottish television comedy
Television series by STV Studios